Chaappa Kurish is a 2011 Indian Malayalam-language chase   thriller film co-written and directed by Sameer Thahir and starring Vineeth Sreenivasan, Fahadh Faasil, Roma Asrani, Remya Nambeesan and Nivetha Thomas in the lead roles.

The film started production in April 2011 at Kochi and released on 14 July. The film is the directorial debut of Thahir. The film was remade in Tamil as Pulivaal with Vimal and  Prasanna.

The film is loosely based on the 2009 South Korean film Handphone with reported structural similarity to the 2002 movie Changing Lanes. The film did extremely well at box office and was a trendsetter for upcoming movies.

Plot
The film revolves around the lives of two people: Arjun, a wealthy builder who owns a big construction business in Kochi who has an affair with his subordinate, Sonia, even though he is preparing to be engaged to his family friend's daughter Ann; and Ansari, who lives in a slum, works in a supermarket doing odd jobs, is mocked for his appearance, and has a crush on his co-worker Nafiza.

When Sonia learns that Arjun is getting engaged to Ann, a fight occurs between the two, and in the heat of the moment, Arjun forgets to take his cell phone. The phone accidentally reaches Ansari's hands. Arjun gets upset over his lost phone because it had videos of Arjun and Sonia having sex. Arjun tries to recover it because he is afraid that the videos getting spread on the internet. Arjun makes several calls to his missing phone, but Ansari always turns it off. Arjun gets terribly frustrated.

Finally, Ansari attends a call but is not ready to give the phone back to Arjun. Ansari undergoes a total change in his character after the phone incident, and Nafiza notices it. Under pressure from Nafiza, Ansari opens up. Realizing the seriousness of the matter, Nafiza asks Ansari to return the phone to its rightful owner.

When the phone's battery runs out, Ansari cannot afford a charger for the phone, so he takes the phone to a shop. After watching the clips, the shop owner uploads the sex video onto internet, where it quickly spreads. Arjun is shown to be regretful of having taken advantage of Sonia's trust in him when she allowed him to record them. Sonia too finds out about the leaked video, and after making a call to Arjun, is shown to be preparing for suicide.

A chase follows when Arjun tries to find Ansari. The two meet in a confrontation that is vicious and bloody before finally settling down and resignedly going their separate ways. Sonia decides to leave town instead of killing herself. Arjun finds out and is seen seeking her out at the airport. He is all bruised from the fight, and the film leaves them at that point while the film ends with Ansari standing up to people who mock him.

Cast
 Vineeth Sreenivasan as Ansari
 Fahadh Faasil as Arjun Samuel 
 Roma Asrani as Ann
 Remya Nambeesan as Sonia
 Nivetha Thomas as Nafiza
 Jinu Joseph as John
 Sunil Sukhada as Store Manager Martin
 Dinesh Panicker as Samuel

Production

Title
"Chappa Kurishu" means Head or Tail in Malayalam. Sameer Thahir says: "While I was writing the script itself, giving shape to the main male leads, Ansari and Arjun , I knew that they were the two sides of the same coin. So I thought of 'Heads or Tails' as the title. But I wanted it in the colloquial lingo. It's called 'Changum Chappayum' in Kollam, 'Thalayum Valum' in Kottayam, 'Thalayum Kozhiyum' in Thrissur, 'Chappa Pulli' in Kozhikode and 'Chaappa Kurish' in Cochin. And I belong to Cochin."

Casting
The director says: "As the script took shape, Vineeth Seenivasan and Fahadh Faasil, two wonderful actors, seemed to fit perfectly as the characters of Ansari and Arjun. In the movie, they are one and the same but stand at two extremes just like the head and tail of a coin."

Filming
Chappa Kurishu was launched by actor Kamal Haasan at the 100th day function of Traffic. The film was produced by Listin Stephen who also produced Traffic. It was director Anwar Rasheed who introduced Sameer Thahir to Listin. The film started production in April 2011 at Ernakulam. The film was shot entirely with a Canon 7D DSLR camera.

Controversies

By the release of the trailer itself Chaappa Kurishu had kick-started controversies. There is some similarities between trailer title insets of American drama film 21 Grams directed by Alejandro González Iñárritu and written by Guillermo Arriaga, released in 2003. The director says: "It was a blunder on my part. I did not give much thought to it while I adopted those lines. Now that it has been asked, it is actually doing good to the movie. So I really don't mind.". Moreover, the film has been accused of stealing the idea from the Korean movie Handphone.

Another controversy was a two-minute smooch between Remya Nambeesan and Fahadh Faasil which was reportedly the longest in a  Malayalam film. Remya says: "An actress should always be ready to take risks if her character demands so. Even when I was aware that the two- minute intense scene could create waves, I was sure that it was inevitable as it suited the plot. A sense of necessity made me accept that scene. I think director Sameer Tahir brought out the best in me. In fact, I enjoyed doing the scene". The director says: "We live in the 21st century and this is no big deal any more. Kissing and making love is part of life. That scene is very relevant to the script. And it is very aesthetically done. It's part of the movie's soul. So there is no reason why I should not include that."

Reception

Keerthy Ramachandran of Deccan Chronicle gave the film a rating of 2 out of 5 stars saying "The film is a dark riveting account of the lives of two men who lead extremely contrasting lives." Veeyen of nowrunning.com rated the film 2.5/5 and said "It's a brave and genuinely heartfelt directorial effort from a young director, who has clearly won the toss this time around." Rediff.com gave the film a score of 2.5 out of 5 saying "Chaappa Kurishu, Samir Thahir's debut as a director holds promise but leaves us with a feeling that it could have been better." Sify on its review said that "Chappa Kurishu shocks the viewers for sure, but sadly for all the wrong reasons." Indiaglitz rated the film 5/10 and wrote: "The generous dose of skin show sequence, violent action and the need for a more tighter scripts will tell on its business and restrict its appeal further to limited audiences."

Soundtrack

The music of the film was composed by Rex Vijayan with lyrics penned by Engandiyur Chandrasekharan.

Awards

References

External links

2010s Malayalam-language films
2011 directorial debut films
Indian chase films
2011 crime thriller films
2011 films
Films scored by Rex Vijayan
2010s romantic thriller films
Malayalam films remade in other languages
Films shot in Kochi
2011 masala films
Indian remakes of South Korean films
Indian crime thriller films
Indian romantic thriller films
Films directed by Sameer Thahir
2010s chase films